Alexander Nikoloz Kutateli ; 6 September 1897 – 1 May 1982) was a Georgian and Soviet writer and translator.

Life

He was born in Kutaisi, son of a lawyer. He studied at Tbilisi University, but did not graduate. His drama The Snake of Hirse was published in 1924. He was active in the Georgian literary milieu. He was author of Poems (1937 and 1941) and Fighters (1942), a collection of stories. He is best known for the novel Face to Face published in four volumes from 1933 to 1952 which covers the fight of the people against the counter-revolutionary Mensheviks.

Notes

Sources

1897 births
1982 deaths
20th-century writers from Georgia (country)
People from Kutaisi
Recipients of the Order of Friendship of Peoples
Recipients of the Order of the Red Banner of Labour
Male writers from Georgia (country)
Translators from Georgia (country)
Soviet male writers
Soviet translators